José Merino del Río  (September 12, 1949 in Burgos, Spain – October 8, 2012) was a Costa Rican politician,  who had been the president of the Broad Front Party and
parliamentary deputy.

References

1949 births
2012 deaths
People from Burgos
Broad Front (Costa Rica) politicians
Spanish emigrants to Costa Rica
Costa Rican atheists